Matthew Hopkins (ca. 1620–1647) was an English witchhunter whose career flourished during the time of the English Civil War. Between 1644 and 1645, Hopkins and his associates were responsible for the deaths of more accused witches than had been executed in the previous 100 years.

In fiction

Literature
In the 17th century, Jacob Bright composed a poem mocking Hopkins that gained approval from royalists and Catholics, shown below:

 Witchfinder General, a 1966 novel by Ronald Bassett.
 The Devil on the Road, a 1978 novel by Robert Westall in which Hopkins makes a late appearance.
 Sarum, the 1987 novel by Edward Rutherfurd, features Hopkins making  a brief appearance in Wiltshire, where he becomes involved in a family quarrel and in an apparent attempt to frame Margaret Shockley as a witch.
 Good Omens (1990), by Terry Pratchett and Neil Gaiman, parodies Hopkins' title through the characters of Newton Pulsifer, entitled "Witchfinder Private" and "Witchfinder Sergeant" Shadwell of the Witchfinder Army, of which Hopkins is said to be the last General.
 A Discovery of Witches (2011), the first volume in the All Souls Trilogy by Deborah Harkness, features an allusion in its title to Hopkins' similarly named book The Discovery of Witches, his memoir of his witch-hunting career.
 Witch Hunt, a 2012 horror/thriller novel by Syd Moore, deals with a young woman who has growing visions of Hopkins and his victims. The book suggests a fictional end to Hopkins in that he flees England for New England in 1647 and continues his prosecution of witches there.
 Pride Before a Fall Through Time, a 2016 novel by Miles Craven, has Hopkins as a character.
 The Witchfinder's Sister, a 2017 novel by Beth Underdown, follows the story of Hopkins' semi-fictional sister, Alice. Hopkins and his role in the East Anglian witch-hunts during the English Civil War feature heavily.
 The Manningtree Witches, a 2021 novel by A.K. Blakemore about the Manningtree Witch trials features Hopkins as a character.

Theatre
The Witchfinder Project, a short musical by Ipswich-based composer Amy Mallett.

Film & TV
Witchfinder General, (US: The Conqueror Worm) a 1968 film based on Bassett's novel starring Vincent Price as Matthew Hopkins.
Blackadder featured a satirical character in episode 5 of the first series in 1983 called the Witchsmeller Persuivant who tries and burns those accused of witchcraft.
The Lords of Salem had Udo Kier playing the part of Matthew Hopkins, but his scenes were deleted.
Whitechapel in the detective's 4th series a serial killer likened to Matthew Hopkins is killing 'alleged' witches in modern day London
The Witchfinder, a 2022 BBC Two sitcom based on a suspected witch being escorted by Witchfinder across East Anglia for trial, with Hopkins featuring as a secondary character portrayed by Reece Shearsmith.

In music
"Witchfinder General" is a song by the Jamaican disco singer Carl Douglas, from his 1974 album Kung Fu Fighting and Other Great Love Songs.
Witchfinder General is a doom metal band from England.
"Witchfinder General" is a song by the band of the same name, from their 1982 debut album Death Penalty.
"Hopkins (The Witchfinder General)" is a song by the doom metal band Cathedral, from the 1995 album The Carnival Bizarre.
"Witchfinder General" is a song by the heavy metal band Saxon, from the 2004 album Lionheart.
Darren Hayman's 2012 concept album The Violence is partially based on Hopkins's witch trials in Essex.

In other media
Matthew Hopkins was used to advertise Walkers Square Crisps. Several of his witch-hunting methods were parodied (notably ordeal by water). His catchphrase was "'Tis not normal". Commemorative square pogs featuring Hopkins were also released to coincide with the adverts.
He made an appearance as a "mystery guest" on the BBC show Russell Howard's Good News. In Puritan garb, Hopkins accused Howard of being a follower of the Devil.
The character of The Paedofinder General in the comedy series Monkey Dust is based on the modern film portrayal of the Witchfinder General.
In the MMORPG RuneScape, the Botfinder General is based on Matthew Hopkins. The role played here is sentencing and then permanently banning accounts that are accused of macroing.
The title character of the Witchsmeller Pursuivant episode of Blackadder is derived from Hopkins's role as "Witchfinder General".
Steve Coogan plays a character based on Matthew Hopkins called 'Witch locater Captain Tobias Slater' from episode 6 'Scream Satan scream!' of the BBC comedy series Dr. Terrible's House of Horrible, first aired 17 December 2001.
 In the online free-to-play role-playing mobile game Fate/Grand Order, Matthew Hopkins was featured as one of the antagonists in Singularity Subspecies IV : Taboo Epiphany Garden : Salem of the Heresy (亜種特異IV 禁忌降臨庭園 セイラム 異端なるセイラム).
 In the dark fantasy turn-based strategy Disciples II: Dark Prophecy, the Hopkins-based character "Witch Hunter" is the first unit in the Inquisition line of the human faction.
 Hopkins largely inspired Philip Wittebane, the main antagonist of the 2020 animated TV series, The Owl House.

References

Citations

Bibliography

Cultural depictions of judges
Cultural depictions of British men
Witchcraft in England